The 1941 Coupe de France Final was a football match held at Stade Municipal, Saint-Ouen on 25 May 1941, that saw Girondins ASP defeat SC Fives 2–0 thanks to goals by Santiago Urtizberea.

Match details

See also
Coupe de France 1940-1941

External links
Coupe de France results at Rec.Sport.Soccer Statistics Foundation
Report on French federation site

Coupe De France Final
1941
Coupe De France Final 1941
Coupe De France Final 1941
Coupe de France Final
Coupe de France Final
Sport in Seine-Saint-Denis